Those Were Wonderful Days is a Merrie Melodies cartoon released in theaters on April 26, 1934 by Warner Bros. Studios. The film was supervised by Bernard B. Brown. The sound was recorded by him in the uncredited. The characters were animated by Paul Smith and Don Williams. The musical score was by Norman Spencer.

Plot
Set in 1898, the cartoon offers a nostalgic look at the United States at the turn of the century. It starts with a barbershop quartet, composed of four men with handlebar moustaches who play old-fashioned music on found objects, leading up to the annual Fourth of July celebration at the local fairground, where a hero and villain fight for the heart of a woman.

The original “So Long Folks” sequence was thought to have been missing due to a splice between an airing of Honeymoon Hotel which features that short's closing sequence. The original short, except for the titles, was found on a Nickelodeon Looney Tunes airing from 1990. However, a restored print with the correct closing sequence was featured in a 2021 episode of MeTV's classic animation series Toon In with Me.

References

External links
 

1934 films
1934 animated films
American black-and-white films
Films scored by Norman Spencer (composer)
Films directed by Bernard B. Brown
Films set in 1898
Films set in the United States
Merrie Melodies short films
1930s Warner Bros. animated short films